Interregional Academy of Personnel Management (translit.: Mizhrehional'na Akademiya upravlinnya personalom, English acronym: MAUP) is a private higher education institution in Ukraine. Founded in 1989 as a non-state establishment, the MAUP consists of a preparatory department, a lyceum, college, institutes and postgraduate school and has over 50,000 students in many branches throughout the country. Since 1991, MAUP has been publishing the Personnel magazine and  the Personnel Plus newspaper. In 2008, the U.S. State Department published its "Contemporary Global Anti-Semitism: A Report Provided to the United States Congress" and singled out MAUP when it stated the organization "is one of the most persistent anti-Semitic institutions in Eastern Europe."

Publications
The MAUP has published more than 300 study plans and manuals and 200 books for educational programs. The Personnel magazine is registered by The Presidium of the State Accreditation Committee as a supplement on economics, law, psychology, pedagogy, philosophy, social and political sciences. MAUP's editions have been recommended for use by The Ministry of Education of Ukraine. It is an affiliate member of the International Personnel Academy and European University Continuing Education Network (EUCEN).

The MAUP asserts that "Pursuant to the results of Sophiya Kyivska, the Rating of Higher Education Establishments in Ukraine (2000), and International Open Popularity and Quality Rating (1998–2000) IRAPM was recognized as the best non-state higher education establishment in Ukraine."

Controversies

Allegations of antisemitism 

In early and mid-2000s, the MAUP became embroiled in controversies because of evident antisemitism in their publications and conferences. The MAUP maintains that their activities can be classified only as anti-Zionism, but the Anti-Defamation League (ADL) has referred to traditional antisemitic propaganda traits that have no connection to Zionism, such as religious antisemitism or solely blaming the Jews for the Russian October Revolution or the Holodomor of 1932–1933 (as a part of the Judeo-Bolshevist antisemitic conspiracy theory).

During October 6, 2004, hearing of the Annual Report on International Religious Freedom 2004 and Designations of Countries of Particular Concern before the Committee on International Relations of the United States Congress, the MAUP was called "[t]he most troubling development" in Ukraine and it was asserted that it receives "significant funding from Arab and Muslim states".

On April 14–19, 2005 the MAUP weekly newspaper Personnel Plus published an open letter to President Yushchenko, Ukrainian Verkhovna Rada Speaker Volodymyr Lytvyn and Supreme Court of Ukraine Chief Justice Malyarenko calling for a parliamentary investigation into the "criminal activities of organized Jewry in Ukraine". The newspaper claimed that the letter was signed by more than a hundred scientific, civic, and political leaders.

On June 3, the MAUP sponsored a one-day conference entitled "Zionism As the Biggest Threat to Modern Civilization" attended by the former Knights of the Ku Klux Klan Grand Wizard David Duke of the United States. The Kyiv Post newspaper called the gathering "a disgusting orgy of racism and hatred". In August 2005, the MAUP awarded Duke with a Kandidat Nauk degree in History.

After the Iranian President Mahmoud Ahmadinejad's widespread misquote, "wipe Israel off the map" (when his real quote was "Israel is an unnatural creature, it will not survive") had evoked international condemnations, on November 4, 2005 the MAUP issued "a decisive protest against large-scale campaign, organized by Zionists, against the Islamic Republic of Iran and its President Mahmoud Ahmadinejad […] where he quoted the words of the Iranian spiritual leader Ayatollah Khomeini about future death of Israel and the USA".

In his November 22 statement, Georgy Shchokin, the MAUP's President who also heads the "International Personnel Academy" (IPA) and the Ukrainian Conservative Party (UCP), combined traditional Christian antisemitism with what has been defined as "new antisemitism", and failed to mention that the UN General Assembly Resolution 3379 of 1975 (equating Zionism and racism) has been revoked in 1991 by the UNGA Resolution 4686:
"We'd like to remind that the Living God Jesus Christ said to Jews two thousand years ago: 'Your father is a devil!' … Zionism in 1975 was acknowledged by General Assembly of UN as the form of racism and race discrimination, that, in the opinion of the absolute majority of modern Europeans, makes the most threat to modern civilization. Israel is the artificially created state (classic totalitarian type). ... Their end is known, and only the God's true will rescue all of us. We are not afraid, as God always together with his children!"

On December 1, 2005, the MAUP held a conference "The Jewish-Bolshevik Revolution of 1917 – the Source of the Red Terrorism and the Starvation of Ukraine".

In the March 2006 issue of the Personnel Plus, an article revived false blood libel accusations from the infamous 1911 Beilis Trial by mischaracterizing the verdict as the jury recognizing the case as ritual murder by persons unknown even though it found Beilis himself not guilty, when in fact the defense had entirely rested on demolishing the concept of Jewish ritual murder. A week earlier, MAUP leaders had visited the grave of Andrei Yuschinsky, the Christian boy who had been the victim in the case.

At a conference held at the MAUP Academy in Kyiv, the heads of the MAUP accused "Rothschild's Soldiers" of the genocide of the Ukrainian people.

On August 15, 2006, an article on the MAUP's website denounced the Bnai Brith as "the Jewish Gestapo".

Reactions 
On November 21, 2005, the Simon Wiesenthal Center issued a public statement to Ukraine's government, requesting they denounce and revoke MAUP's accreditation.

On December 5, the President of the Ukrainian American Coordinating Council (UACC) Ihor Gawdiak issued a statement "to convey our profound shock and distress concerning the horrific statement made on 4 November by the heads of the International Academy of Manpower Management (MAUP) in support of the Iranian President's statement that Israel should be wiped off the map."

On the same day, the office of the President of Ukraine Viktor Yushchenko issued a statement which said in part:
"The Head of State is worried that anti-Semitism spreads throughout Ukraine. He condemned the Interregional Academy of Personnel Management (IAPM) as an institution that systematically publishes anti-Semitic articles in its publication Personnel. Yushchenko said he had left the supervisory council of the journal to protest against this inhumane policy. He called on professors of the IAPM to respect citizens of all nationalities and confessions and to "stop rousing national hatred."President condemns anti-Semitism  Press office of President Victor Yushchenko of Ukraine. December 5, 2005

Yushchenko once sat on MAUP's board, and Foreign Minister of Ukraine Borys Tarasyuk was honorary director of one of MAUP's subdivisions until 2005. Yushchenko resigned from MAUP several years ago, following its criticism by Jewish organizations.

On December 6, the ADL urged the US House of Representatives to delay approval of Ukraine's graduation from the Jackson-Vanik amendment. The ADL National Director Abraham Foxman wrote: "We expect more from democratic states than we do from totalitarian ones. This year alone has seen a steep increase in acts of violence and vandalism against Jews across Ukraine. There have been attempts to ban everything from Jewish organizations to Jewish holy texts.  The university MAUP [...] actively promotes anti-Semitism of the most vicious kind."

On December 7, the US-Ukraine Foundation (USUF) condemned "[...] the November 4, 2005 statements by the Interregional Academy of Personnel Management (MAUP) as hateful, virulent and having no place in the public discourse in Ukraine or anywhere else. MAUP's anti-Semitic statements supporting the Iranian President's recent call for Israel to be 'wiped off the map' was an affront to decency that provoked the unequivocal international condemnation it deserved." 

Speaking on national television on January 23, 2006, Foreign Minister of Ukraine Borys Tarasyuk "strongly condemned the anti-Semitic actions of MAUP University" and confirmed that "having exhausted all efforts to convince MAUP leaders to drop their unlawful and wrongful actions" he broke off contacts with University a year ago. In its press release, the Ministry of Education and Science of Ukraine accused MAUP of breaking Ukrainian law, noting "persistent incompliance with requirements of state licensing rules for universities, failure to abide with legally binding decisions of the State Accreditation Commission", qualifying it as "a general negligence of law and a desire to pursue activities inconsistent with the status of Higher Education Institute in Ukraine".

This move was welcomed by the UACC, National Coalition Supporting Soviet Jewry, the ADL, and other human rights advocates.

The leader of Vaad in Ukraine Joseph Zissels called MAUP "the most influential center of anti-Semitism in the country."

The latest rebuke came from Ukraine's High Court which ruled against MAUP as it sought to sue the Jewish Confederation of Ukraine for publishing articles "about MAUP activities directed against the Jewish community and Zionism".

Notable alumni
 David Duke, American politician, Holocaust denier, former Grand Wizard of the Louisiana based Knights of the Ku Klux Klan, and former member of the Louisiana House of Representatives.
 Volodymyr Groysman, former Prime Minister of Ukraine

See also 
Antisemitism in Ukraine
Racism and discrimination in Ukraine
History of the Jews in Russia and the Soviet Union
History of anti-Semitism
Zionology

References

External links 
 Anti-Semitic mood heats up in Ukraine (PDF, June 2005, p.44.) Section in the "Bulletin of United Social Democratic Party of Ukraine".
 Ukraine University Schooling in Anti-Semitism Report of the Anti-Defamation League NGO
 MAUP official website
 Personnel MAUP publication
 Personnel Plus MAUP publication
 Critical analysis of the literature published by MAUP
 Zionism As the Biggest Threat to Modern Civilization MAUP conference
 A plot against MAUP, MAUP's open telegram in the Personnel Plus newspaper
 Order at MAUP: Read Racist Literature by Sergey Kovtunenko at the Stolichnye Novosti
 MAUP diplomas are not recognized in Poland at MigNews

 
1989 establishments in Ukraine
Antisemitism in Ukraine
Blood libel
Jewish Ukrainian history
Universities in Ukraine
Universities and colleges in Kyiv
Anti-Zionism in Ukraine